World Aircraft Information Files (WAIF) is a weekly partwork magazine published by Bright Star Publications (part of Midsummer Books) in the United Kingdom. Each issue was priced at £1.70 for issues 1–163, and £1.80 for issues 164–218. Altogether, there were 218 issues in the complete set, which completed in 2002. Originally advertised as having 200 issues, the run was extended to 218 issues when approximately 576 pages were missing from the collection. An index to the complete series was given in the final issue.

Overview
Published in 218 weekly parts, each issue comprised 32 pages, the same large page size as World Airpower Journal and Wings of Fame. The pages were organised as a series of pull-out reference files to be slotted into ring binders. There were 1,041 file subjects – although there were only 1008 numbered files. During the production of the partwork, the publishers realised that some aeroplanes and airlines were missed from the index, necessitating additions. Hence, 'missing' files were numbered by adding the prefix "a" (and "b", "c" or "d" where necessary) after the previous file number – for example, between Files 591 (Air Niugini) and 592 (Air Transat) is 591a (Air Seychelles).

Subject coverage
The subjects covered are grouped into 14 categories as follows:

{| class="wikitable collapsible collapsed" border="1"
|+
!File
!width=600|Title
|-
|326||Western Europe
(Austria: Österreichische Luftstreitkräfte (Austrian Air Force);
Belgium: Belgische Luchtmacht, Composante Air (Belgian Air Component);
Denmark: Flyvevåbnet (Royal Danish Air Force), Søværnets Helikoptertjeneste (Royal Danish Navy Helicopter Service);
Finland: Finnish: Ilmavoimat, Swedish: Flygvapnet (Finnish Air Force), Finnish: Suomen maavoimat – Helikopteripataljoona, Swedish: Finländska armén – Helikopterbataljonen (Finnish Army Aviation Wing), Finnish: Rajavartiolaitos, Swedish: Gränsbevakningsväsendet (Finnish Border Guard);
France: Armée de l'Air (French Air Force), Aviation navale (French Naval Aviation), Aviation Légère de l’Armée de Terre, ALAT (French Army Light Aviation);
Germany: Luftwaffe (German Air Force), Marineflieger (German Navy Flight), Heeresfliegertruppe (German Army Aviators Corps);
NATO: Allied Air Forces Central Europe;
Netherlands: Koninklijke Luchtmacht (KLu) (Royal Netherlands Air Force), Marine-Luchtvaartdienst (MLD) (Netherlands Naval Aviation Service);
Norway: Kongelige Norske Luftforsvaret (Royal Norwegian Air Force);
Republic of Ireland: Aer Chór na hÉireann (Irish Air Corps);
Sweden: Svenska Flygvapnet (Swedish Air Force), Försvarsmaktens helikopterflottilj (Swedish Armed Forces Helicopter Wing);
Switzerland: German: Schweizer Luftwaffe; French: Forces aériennes suisses; Italian: Forze Aeree Svizzere (Swiss Air Force); United Kingdom: Royal Air Force, Fleet Air Arm, Army Air Corps)
|-
|327||Central Europe
(Albania: Forcat Ajrore Shqiptare (Albanian Air Force);
Bosnia: Zrakoplovstvo i PZO Bosne i Hercegovine – Ваздухопловство и ПВО Боснe и Херцеговинe (Air Force and Anti-Aircraft Defense);
Bulgaria: Военновъздушни сили, ВВС (Bulgarian Air Force);
Croatia: Hrvatsko ratno zrakoplovstvo i protuzračna obrana (Croatian Air Force and Defense);
Czech Republic: Vzdušné síly Armády České republiky (Czech Air Force);
Hungary: Magyar Légierő (Hungarian Air Force), Vörös Légjárócsapat (Red Hungarian Air Corps);
Macedonia: Воено Воздухопловство на Република Македонија – Voeno vozduhoplovstvo na Republika Makedonija (Macedonian Air Force);
Poland: Siły Powietrzne Rzeczypospolitej Polskiej (Siły Powietrzne RP) (Polish Air Force), Lotnictwo Wojsk Lądowych (Polish Army Aviation), Lotnictwo Marynarki Wojennej (Polish Naval Aviation), Lotnictwo Straży Granicznej (Polish Border Guard);
Romania: Forţele Aeriene Române (Romanian Air Force);
Slovak Republic: Slovak Air Force;
Slovenia: Brigada zračne Obrambe in Letalstva Slovenske Vojske (Slovenian Air Force and Air Defence);
Yugoslavia: Federal Republic of Yugoslavia: Ратно ваздухопловство и противваздушна одбрана (Air Force of the Federal Republic of Yugoslavia/Serbia and Montenegro) (defunct); Serbia: Ваздухопловство и противваздушна одбрана – В и ПВО or Vazduhoplovstvo i protivvazdušna odbrana – V i PVO (Serbian Air Force and Air Defense); Kosovo: Military of Kosovo; Montenegro: Vazdušne snage Crne Gore (Military of Montenegro Aircraft))
|-
|328||Southern Europe and Mediterranean
(Greece: Πολεμική Αεροπορία (ΠΑ) – Polemikí Aeroporía (Hellenic Air Force), Αεροπορία Στρατού – Aeroporia Stratou (Hellenic Army Aviation Wing), Πολεμικό Ναυτικό – Polemiko Navtiko (Hellenic Navy Aviation Wing), Λιμενικό Σώμα – Limeniko Soma (Hellenic Coast Guard);
Italy: Aeronautica Militare (Italian Air Force), Aviazione Navale (Italian Naval Aviation), Cavalleria dell'Aria (Italian Army Aviation), Nucleo Elicotteri Carabinieri (Helicopter Service of the Carabinieers);
Portugal': Força Aérea Portuguesa, FAP (Portuguese Air Force), Aviação Naval Portuguesa (Portuguese Naval Aviation);Spain: Ejército del Aire (Spanish Air Force), Fuerzas Aeromóviles del Ejército de Tierra (Spanish Army Airmobile Force), Armada Española Arma Aérea (Spanish Navy Air Arm);Turkey: Türk Hava Kuvvetleri (Turkish Air Force), Türk Kara Kuvvetleri Havacılığı (Turkish Land Force Aviation), Türk Donanma Havacılığı (Turkish Naval Aviation), Türk Sahil Güvenlik Havacılığı (Turkish Coast Guard Aviation))
|-
|329||Former Soviet Union
(Azerbaijan: Azərbaycan hərbi hava qüvvələri (Azerbaijani Air Force);Belarus: Belarusian Air Force;Estonia: Õhuvägi (Estonian Air Force);Georgia: საქართველოს სამხედრო-საჰაერო ძალები – sak’art’velos samxedro-sahaero dzalebi (Georgian Air Force);Kazakhstan: Sil Vozdushnoy Oborony Respubliki Kazakhstan (Kazakhstan Air and Air Defense Forces);Kyrgyzstan: Kyrgyzstan Air Force;Latvia: Latvijas Gaisa spēki (Latvian Air Force);Lithuania: Lietuvos karinės oro pajėgos (LKOP) (Lithuanian Air Force);Moldova: Moldovan Air Force;Russia: Военно-воздушные cилы России – Voyenno-vozdushnye sily Rossii (Russian Air Force), Авиация Военно-морского флота – Aviatsiya Voenno-morskogo Flota (Russian Naval Aviation);Tajikistan: Tajikistan Air and Air Defense Troops;Turkmenistan: Turkmenistan Air Force and Air Defense Force;Ukraine: Повітряні Сили України – Povitryani Syly Ukrayiny (Ukrainian Air Force), Морська Авіація – Morska Aviatsiya (Ukrainian Naval Aviation);Uzbekistan: Uzbek Air and Air Defense Force)
|-
|330||Middle East
(Bahrain: Royal Bahraini Air Force;Iran: یروی هوایی ارتش جمهوری اسلامی ایران (Islamic Republic of Iran Air Force), Islamic Republic of Iran Army, Islamic Republic of Iran Navy Aviation, Air Force of the Army of the Guardians of the Islamic Revolution;Iraq: Al Quwwa al Jawwiya al Iraqiya – القوة الجوية العراقية (Iraqi Air Force);Israel: זרוע האויר והחלל – Zroa HaAvir VeHahalal (Israeli Air Force);Jordan: سلاح الجو الملكي الأردني – Al Quwwat al-Jawwiya Almalakiya al-Urduniya Royal Jordanian Air Force);Kuwait: al-Quwwat al-Jawwiya al-Kuwaitiya (Kuwait Air Force);Lebanon: القوات الجوية اللبنانية – Al Quwwat al-Jawwiya al-Lubnania (Lebanese Air Force);Oman: Al Quwwat al-Jawwiya al-Sultanya al-Omanya (Royal Air Force of Oman);Palestine: None – as of 2000, 6 aircraft in use using civilian markings;Qatar: Qatar Emiri Air Force;Saudi Arabia: القوات الجوية الملكية السعودية – Al Quwwat al Jawwiya al Malakhiah as Sa'udiya (Royal Saudi Air Force);Syria: القوّات الجوية العربية السورية – Al Quwwat al-Jawwiya al Arabiya as-Souriya (Syrian Air Force);United Arab Emirates: United Arab Emirates Air Force;Yemen: Al Quwwat al Jawwiya al Yemeniya (Yemeni Air Force))
|-
|331||South Asia
(Bangladesh: বাংলােদশ িবমান বািহনী – Bangladesh Biman Bahini (Bangladesh Air Force);India: भारतीय वायु सेना – Bharatiya Vayu Sena (Indian Air Force), Indian Army Aviation Corps, Indian Naval Air Arm, Bharatiya Tatarakshak Dal (Indian Coast Guard);Maldives: Maldives National Defence Force;Mauritius: Mauritius Coast Guard;Pakistan: پاک فضائیہ – Pak Fiza'ya (Pakistan Air Force), Pakistan Army Aviation Wing, Pakistan Navy Air Arm;Sri Lanka: Sri Lanka Air Force)
|-
|332||Central Asia
(Afghanistan: Afghan Melli-e Ourdou (Afghan National Army Air Corps);Bhutan: Bhutan Air Force;China: 中国人民解放军空军 – Zhongguo Renmin Jiefangjun Kongjun (People's Liberation Army Air Force), 中国人民解放军海军航空兵 – Zhongguo Renmin Jiefangjun Haijun Hangkongbing (People's Liberation Army Naval Air Force), 中国人民解放军陆军 (People's Liberation Army Ground Force Aircraft);Mongolia: Агаарын Довтолгооноос Хамгаалах Цэргийн Командлал (Mongolian Air Defense Forces Command);Nepal: Nepalese Army Air Service)
|-
|333||Southeast Asia
(Cambodia: Toap Akas Khemarak Phoumin – Force Aérienne Royale Cambodge (Royal Cambodian Air Force);Indonesia: Tentara Nasional Indonesia Angkatan Udara (TNI-AU) (Indonesian National Air Force), Dinas Penerbangan TNI Angkatan Laut (TNI-AL) (Indonesian Naval Aviation), Dinas Penerbangan TNI Angkatan Darat (TNI-AD) (Indonesian Army Aviation);Laos: Lao People's Liberation Army Air Force;Malaysia: Udara DiRaja Malaysia (TUDM) (Royal Malaysian Air Force);Myanmar: Tatmdaw Lei (Myanmar Air Force);Singapore: Chinese: 新加坡空军部队; Malay: Angkatan Udara Republik Singapura; Tamil: சிங்கப்பூர் ஆகாயப்படை (Republic of Singapore Air Force);Thailand: กองทัพอากาศไทย – Kongthap Akat Thai (Royal Thai Air Force);Vietnam: Không Quân Nhân Dân Việt Nam (Vietnamese People's Air Force))
|-
|334||Far East (North)
(Japan: 航空自衛隊 – Kōkū Jieitai (Japan Air Self-Defense Force), 海上自衛隊 – Kaijō Jieitai (Japan Maritime Self-Defense Force), 陸上自衛隊 – Rikujō Jieitai (Japan Ground Self-Defense Force);North Korea: 조선인민군 공군 (Korean People's Air Force);South Korea: 대한민국 공군 (大韓民國空軍) – Daehan Minguk Gonggun (Republic of Korea Air Force))
|-
|335||Far East (South)
(Philippines: Hukbong Himpapawid ng Pilipinas (Philippine Air Force);Republic of China (Taiwan): 中華民國空軍 – Chung-Hua Min-Kuo K'ung-Chün (Republic of China Air Force), Republic of China Army Aviation and Special Forces Command, Republic of China Naval Aviation Command)
|-
|336||Australasia
(Australia: Royal Australian Air Force, Australian Navy Aviation Group (Royal Australian Navy Fleet Air Arm), Australian Army Aviation;Fiji: There are no aircraft in the inventory of the Military of Fiji;New Zealand: Royal New Zealand Air Force;Papua New Guinea: Papua New Guinea Defence Force;Tonga: Tonga Defence Services)
|-
|337||North Africa
(Algeria: القوات الجوية الجزائرية – Al Quwwat aljawwiya aljaza'eriiya (Algerian Air Force);Cape Verde: Força Aérea Caboverdiana (Cape Verde Air Force), Guarda Costeira de Cabo Verde (Cape Verde Coast Guard);Chad: Force Aérienne Tchadienne (Chadian Air Force);Egypt: Egyptian Air Force;Libya: القوات الجوية الليبية – Adwas Alibyan Ujnna (Libyan Air Force);Mali: Force Aérienne de la Republique du Mali (Mali Air Force);Mauritania: Force Aérienne de la Republique Islamique de Mauritanie (Mauritanian Air Force);Morocco: القوات الجوية الملكية المغربية – Al Quwwat Al Jawwiya Al Malikiya Al Maghrebiya (Force Aérienne Royale Marocaine) (Royal Moroccan Air Force);Niger: Escadrille Nationale du Niger (National Squadron of Niger);Tunisia: Al Quwwat al-Jawwiya al-Jamahiriyah At'Tunisia (Tunisian Air Force))
|-
|338||Central Africa (West)
(Angola: National Air Force of Angola;Benin: Force Aérienne Populaire de Benin (Benin Air Force);Burkina Faso: Force Aérienne de Burkina Faso (Burkina Faso Air Force);Cameroon: Armée de l'Air du Cameroun (Cameroon Air Force);Côte d'Ivoire: Côte d'Ivoire Air Force;Central African Republic: Force Aérienne Centrafricaine (Central African Republic Air Force);Congo: L'Armée de l'Air du Congo (Congolese Air Force);Congo (Zaïre): Force Aérienne du Congo (Air Force of the Democratic Republic of the Congo);Equatorial Guinea: Air Force of Equatorial Guinea;Gabon: Armée de l'Air Gabonaise (Gabon Air Force);Gambia: Gambian Air Force;Ghana: Ghana Air Force;Guinea Bissau: Força Aérea da Guiné-Bissau (Guinea-Bissau Air Force);Guinea Republic: Force Aérienne de Guinée (Guinea Air Force);Liberia: Liberian Army Air Wing;Nigeria: Nigerian Air Force;Rwanda: Force Aérienne Rwandaise (Rwandan Air Force);Senegal: Armée de l'Air du Sénégal (Senegalese Air Force);Sierra Leone: Sierra Leone Defence Force;Togo: Force Aérienne Togolaise (Togolese Air Force))
|-
|339||Central Africa (East)
(Burundi: Force Armée du Burundi (Burundi Army Aviation);Djiboti: Force Aérienne du Djibouti (Djiboti Air Force);Eritrea: Eritrean Air Force;Ethiopia: Ye Ithopya Ayer Hayl (Ethiopian Air Force);Kenya: Kenya Air Force;Madagascar: Armée de l'Air Malgache (Malagasy Air Force
);Somalia: Somali: Ciidamada Cirka Soomaaliyeed, Italian: 'Corpo di Sicurezza della Somalia, Somali Aeronautical Corps' (Somali Air Force) (defunct);Sudan: Al Quwwat al-Jawwiya As-Sudaniya (Sudanese Air Force);Tanzania: Jeshi la Anga la Wananchi wa Tanzania (Tanzanian People's Defense Force Air Wing);Uganda: Ugandan Air Force)
|-
|340||Southern Africa
(Botswana: Botswana Defence Force Air Wing;Lesotho: Lesotho Defence Force – Air Squadron;Malawi: Malawi Army Air Wing;Mozambique: Forca Aérea De Moçambique (Mozambique Air Force);Namibia: Namibian Air Force;South Africa: South African Air Force;Swaziland: Swazi Air Force;Zimbabwe: Air Force of Zimbabwe)
|-
|341||North America
(Canada: Canadian Forces Air Command;Mexico: Fuerza Aérea Mexicana (Mexican Air Force), Fuerza Aeronaval (Mexican Naval Aviation);United States of America: United States Air Force, United States Army Aviation Branch, United States Naval Aviation, United States Marine Corps Aviation, Air National Guard, NASA)
|-
|342||Central America
(Belize: Belize Defence Force Air Wing;Costa Rica: Servicio de Vigilancia Aérea (SVA) – Fuerza Pública (Air Surveillance Service);Dominican Republic: Dominican Air Force, Escuadrón de Caballería Aérea (EdCA) (Dominican Air Cavalry Squadron), Cuerpo de Aviación Naval Dominicana (Dominican Republic Naval Aviation Corps);El Salvador: Fuerza Aérea Salvadoreña (Air Force of El Salvador);Guatemala: Guatemalan Air Force;Honduras: Honduran Air Force;Nicaragua: Nicaraguan Air Force;Panama: Servicio Nacional Aeronaval (National Air-Sea Service))
|-
|343||Caribbean
(Bahamas: Royal Bahamas Defence Force;Barbados: Barbados Defence Force;Cuba: Fuerza Aérea Revolucionaria (Cuban Revolutionary Air Force), Aviación Naval (Cuban Naval Aviation);Haiti: Corps d'Aviation d'Garde d'Haiti (Haiti Air Corps);Jamaica: Jamaican Defence Force;Trinidad & Tobago: Trinidad and Tobago Defence Force Air Guard)
|-
|344||South America (North)
(Bolivia: Fuerza Aérea Boliviana (Bolivian Air Force);Brazil: Força Aérea Brasileira (Brazilian Air Force), Aviação Naval Brasileira (Brazilian Naval Aviation), Comando de Aviação do Exército (Brazilian Army Aviation Command);Colombia: Fuerza Aérea Colombiana (Colombian Air Force), Aviación Naval (Colombian Naval Aviation), Ejército (Colombian National Army Aviation)Ecuador: Fuerza Aérea Ecuatoriana (Ecuadorian Air Force), Aviacióin Naval Ecuatoriana (Ecuadorian Naval Aviation), Aviación del Ejército Ecuatoriano (Ecuadorian Army Aviation);Guyana: Guyana Defence Force;Peru: Fuerza Aérea del Perú (Peruvian Air Force), Fuerza de Aviación Naval (Peruvian Naval Aviation), Aviación del Ejército (Peruvian Army Aviation);Surinam: Surinaamse Luchtmacht (Suriname Air Force);Venezuela: Aviación Militar Venezolana (Fuerza Aérea Venezolana before 2006) (Venezuelan Air Force), Servicio Aéreo del Ejército Venezolana (Venezuelan Army Aviation), Aviación de la Marina Venezolana (Venezuelan Naval Aviation), Comando de Apoyo Aéreo de Guardia Nacional (National Guard of Venezuela))
|-
|345||South America (South)
(Argentina: Fuerza Aérea Argentina (Argentine Air Force), Comando de Aviación Naval Argentina (Argentine Naval Aviation), Comando de Aviación del Ejército Argentino (Argentine Army Aviation Command), Servicio de Aviación de la Prefectura Naval Argentina (Coast Guard Air Service), Dirección de Aeronáutica de Gendarmería (Border Guard Air Service))Chile: Fuerza Aérea de Chile (Chilean Air Force), Servicio de Aviación de la Armada de Chile (or Aviación Naval) (Chilean Naval Aviation), Comando de Aviación del Ejército de Chile (or Aviación del Ejército) (Chilean Army Aviation);Paraguay: Aeronautica Militar Paraguaya (Paraguayan Air Force), Aviación Naval Paraguaya (Paraguayan Naval Aviation);Uruguay: Fuerza Aérea Uruguaya (Uruguayan Air Force), Aviación Naval Uruguaya (Uruguayan Naval Aviation))
|}

Depth of coverage

Since each subject was covered in only 2 or 4 sides (in a "file"), the depth of coverage could be limited, although for many subjects, this was overcome by including many sheets on different aspects of the same subject (for example, different variants, different uses, etc.). 

The A-Z of aircraft'' was based on previous Aerospace Publishing publications with some updating. The bias towards aircraft types early in the alphabet was accentuated in the partwork, with letters A through F making up fully 64% of the total while letters P through Z made up 9%.

References

External links
 Aeroflight website information about WAIF

Aviation magazines
Transport magazines published in the United Kingdom
Weekly magazines published in the United Kingdom
Defunct magazines published in the United Kingdom
Magazines established in 1997
Magazines disestablished in 2002
Military magazines published in the United Kingdom
Partworks